Ramesh 

Ramesh is a common name. In Persian, the name is derived from Pahlavi origin "Ramishn", meaning "happiness". It is also an Indian masculine given name, from Sanskrit, diminutive of Rameshwar(Ram- Ishwar). Where Ram = Lord Rama and Ishwar means God, "Rameshwar" means The Lord Rama's God, whom he used to pray (Lord Shiva)". It is used among Hindus, Jains and Buddhists and some Christians.

Notable people with the name include:
Jairam Ramesh (born 1954), Indian politician
Jithan Ramesh (born 1981), Tamil cinema actor
Ramachandran Ramesh (born 1976), Indian chess grandmaster
Sadagoppan Ramesh (born 1975), Indian cricketer and film actor
Ramesh Aravind (born 1964), Kannada movie actor
Ramesh Bhat, Kannada movie actor
Ramesh Chennithala, (born 1956), Kerala politician
Ramesh Datla, Indian industrialist
Ramesh Karad (born 1968), Indian politician from Maharashtra
Ramesh Krishnan (born 1961), Indian tennis player
Pasupuleti Ramesh Naidu (1933–1987), Telugu film music director
Ramesh Ponnuru (born 1974), American political commentator
Asogan Ramesh Ramachandren (c. 1973–1998), Singaporean convicted murderer
Ramesh Rushantha ( born 1983), Sri Lankan travel vlogger, water sports instructor and deckhand 
Ramesh Sippy (born 1947), Indian film producer
Sachin Ramesh Tendulkar, Indian cricketer

Fictional characters
Professor Ramesh, fictional astronomer in Kim Possible
Ramesh Majhu fictional shopkeeper in Fags, Mags and Bags

References

Indian masculine given names